Nameless Island is an island in Sitka, Alaska, United States.

Nameless Island was named in the year 1809 by a Russian navigator, and the present name is a translation from the Russian.

References

Islands of Alaska
Islands of Sitka, Alaska